Assyria Council of Europe is a lobbying organization based in Brussels, that lobbies the European Union and other European countries on behalf of the Assyrian people worldwide.

References

External links
Assyria Council of Europe Condemns Iraq Church Bombings
Situation of Iraqi Assyrian Christians Discussed in Nuremberg
Official website

Assyrian organizations